Chambon-sur-Cisse (literally Chambon on Cisse) is a former commune in the Loir-et-Cher department in central France. On 1 January 2017, it was merged into the commune Valencisse.

Population

See also
Communes of the Loir-et-Cher department

References

Former communes of Loir-et-Cher